The Esowista Peninsula is a peninsula in the Clayoquot Sound region of the west coast of Vancouver Island, British Columbia, Canada. The name was adopted in 1934 in reference to Esowista Indian Reserve No. 3. It was originally charted as Low Peninsula by the Royal Navy in 1860. Much of the peninsula is within the Pacific Rim National Park Reserve.

Meaning of name
"Esowista" is a transliteration of the original Nuu-chah-nulth language word, hisaawista – "Captured by clubbing the people who lived there to death".

References

Clayoquot Sound region
Peninsulas of British Columbia